Seth Daniel Rosin (born November 2, 1988) is an American former Major League Baseball (MLB) pitcher who played for the Texas Rangers and Philadelphia Phillies in 2014 and 2015.

Career

Amateur
Rosin attended Mounds View High School in Arden Hills, Minnesota. After graduating high school, the Minnesota Twins selected Rosin in the 28th round of the 2007 MLB Draft. Rosin opted not to sign, and instead enrolled at the University of Minnesota, where he played college baseball for the Minnesota Golden Gophers, he was named to the All-Big Ten team in 2009 and 2010. In 2009, he played collegiate summer baseball with the Hyannis Mets of the Cape Cod Baseball League.

San Francisco Giants
The San Francisco Giants selected Rosin in the fourth round of the 2010 MLB Draft, and Rosin signed. He spent 2010 through 2012 in the Giants farm system with the Salem-Keizer Volcanoes of the Class A-Short Season Northwest League, the Augusta Greenjackets of the Class A Southern League, and the San Jose Giants of the Class A-Advanced California League.

Philadelphia Phillies
The Giants traded Rosin, Nate Schierholtz, and Tommy Joseph to the Philadelphia Phillies in exchange for Hunter Pence on July 31, 2012. He played in 3 games for the Clearwater Threshers of the Class A-Advanced Florida State League at the end of 2012 and was then promoted to the Reading Phillies of the Class AA Eastern League. in 2013, where he was 9-6 with a 4.33 ERA in 26 games (23 starts).

New York Mets
The New York Mets selected Rosin from the Philadelphia Phillies in the 2013 Rule 5 Draft.

Los Angeles Dodgers
He was then traded to the Los Angeles Dodgers that same day.

Rosin made the Dodgers 25-man opening day roster. However, he did not play in the opening series in Australia and was claimed off waivers by the Texas Rangers on March 26. Rosin was designated for assignment by the Rangers on April 9.

Second Stint with Phillies
He cleared waivers and was returned to the Phillies, who assigned him to the Lehigh Valley IronPigs of the Class AAA International League. The Phillies demoted Rosin to Reading in June.

San Diego Padres
A free agent after the 2015 season, Rosin signed a minor league contract with the San Diego Padres in February 2016.

Minnesota Twins
In February 2017, Rosin signed a minor league contract with the Minnesota Twins. He was released on March 25, 2017.

St. Paul Saints
On April 20, Rosin signed with the St. Paul Saints of the American Association of Independent Professional Baseball.

Second Stint with Giants
On July 5, 2017, Rosin signed a minor league deal with the San Francisco Giants, who assigned him to the Richmond Flying Squirrels of the Eastern League. He elected free agency on November 6, 2017.

References

External links

1988 births
Living people
Sportspeople from Fargo, North Dakota
Baseball players from North Dakota
Baseball players from Minnesota
Major League Baseball pitchers
Texas Rangers players
Philadelphia Phillies players
Minnesota Golden Gophers baseball players
Hyannis Harbor Hawks players
Salem-Keizer Volcanoes players
Augusta GreenJackets players
Scottsdale Scorpions players
San Jose Giants players
Clearwater Threshers players
Reading Fightin Phils players
Lehigh Valley IronPigs players
El Paso Chihuahuas players
St. Paul Saints (AA) players
Richmond Flying Squirrels players